Promising Young Woman is a 2020 American black comedy tragedy thriller film written, co-produced, and directed by Emerald Fennell in her feature directorial debut, featuring Carey Mulligan in the lead role, alongside Bo Burnham, Alison Brie, Clancy Brown, Jennifer Coolidge, Laverne Cox, and Connie Britton in supporting roles. It is produced by Margot Robbie's production company LuckyChap Entertainment and FilmNation Entertainment. 

The film follows Cassie (Mulligan), a young unstable woman haunted by a traumatic past as she navigates balancing forgiveness and vengeance. The film had its world premiere at the Sundance Film Festival on January 25, 2020, and was theatrically released in the United States on December 25, 2020, by Focus Features. It received positive reviews from critics, with praise for its screenplay, direction, and Mulligan's performance, and grossed $17 million worldwide.

Promising Young Woman received five nominations at the 93rd Academy Awards and won Best Original Screenplay. At the 74th British Academy Film Awards, the film won two out of its six nominations — Best Original Screenplay and Outstanding British Film. It further received nominations for four Golden Globes, six Critics' Choice Movie Awards (winning Best Actress for Mulligan and Best Original Screenplay), one Screen Actors Guild Awards, four AACTA Awards (winning Best International Film and Best International Actress for Mulligan), amongst several others. The primary wins at most ceremonies, were for Mulligan's performance, and Fennell's screenplay and direction.

Accolades

See also 
 2021 in film
 Promising Young Woman (score)
 Promising Young Woman (soundtrack)

References

External links
 

Promising Young Woman